Rustam Sadykovich Asimov (born September 20, 1958) is an Uzbek politician who was Deputy Prime Minister of Uzbekistan from 2005 to 2017. He served as Minister of Finance from 1998 to 2000 and from 2005 to 2016.

Biography
Born in Tashkent in 1958, Azimov was educated in engineering and holds a doctorate in economics. He was the chief economist for a collective farm near Dzizhak during the 1970s. After independence in 1991, Azimov served as head of Uzbekistan’s National Bank for Foreign Activities and dealt with the European Bank for Reconstruction and Development (EBRD). 

He entered politics in 1994 when he was elected to the Uzbek parliament Oliy Majlis. He was Minister of Finance from 1998 to 2000 before being named Minister of Macroeconomics and Statistics. In 2002, he was appointed as Deputy Prime Minister for the Economy, a powerful position, and was again named Minister of Finance in 2005. He was considered to be one of the leading contenders to succeed Islam Karimov as President of Uzbekistan. Azimov was often seen at Karimov's side during international meetings and was seen as better in relating to politicians outside Uzbekistan compared to other presidential aspirants.

Notes

References

1958 births
Government ministers of Uzbekistan
Finance ministers of Uzbekistan
Living people
Politicians from Tashkent
Tashkent Institute of Irrigation and Agricultural Mechanization Engineers alumni